Oregon Ballot Measure 113, the Exclusion from Re-election for Legislative Absenteeism Initiative, is an amendment to the Constitution of Oregon that passed as part of the 2022 Oregon elections. The amendment means that legislators with ten unexcused absences from floor sessions will be disqualified from serving in the legislature following their current term. 

The Oregon Constitution requires that two thirds of the Oregon State Senate or Oregon House of Representatives be present to conduct a session. The purpose of this amendment is to discourage walkout protests, where members of the minority party are intentionally absent in order to block passing new laws that they do not have the voting majority to prevent through normal democratic processes. The amendment is intended to discourage this by preventing any legislator from being re-elected if they repeatedly fail to attend sessions "without permission or excuse", though the text of the amendment does not specifically define what counts as valid permission or excuse for being absent. 

Oregon law says that legislators may be compelled to attend floor sessions or expelled for "disorderly conduct", but there were previously no automatic consequences for failure to attend sessions, nor is disorderly conduct clearly defined. In practice, legislators absconded out of state during walkouts, so that they are out of reach of Oregon law enforcement until a walkout has its intended effect, and then they return without consequence.

See also 
 List of Oregon ballot measures

References 

2022 Oregon ballot measures
Oregon Legislative Assembly